The Sićevo Gorge, a river gorge and archaeological site in southeastern Serbia, is the locally most prominent geological and topographic feature formed by the Nišava River. The gorge is located between the towns of Bela Palanka and Niška Banja. The gorge is cut into the Kunovica plateau, between the southern slopes of the Svrljig Mountains and the mountain of Suva Planina. The surrounding areas are known for their high-quality vineyards. The gorge contains a stone quarry, the Ostrovica and six villages. The largest, Sićevo is the eponym of the gorge.

Archaeological findings

In June 2008, a lower jaw fragment was excavated in the Mala Balanica cave, one of several cave sites in the gorge. This hominin jaw bone fossil was dated to be between 397,000 and 525,000 years old on the basis of electron spin resonance in combination with uranium series isotopic analysis and infrared/post-infrared luminescence dating. The morphology of the mandible differs significantly from the more recent Homo heidelbergensis and completely lacks any prominent Homo neanderthalensis features. The jaw represents one of an increasing number of specimen discoveries in the south-eastern part of the European continent. It demonstrates plesiomorphic erectus-like traits that are coupled with synapomorphic traits common to Chibanian hominins. It was recently suggested that the fossil specimen could belong to the newly described species Homo bodoensis.

References

Canyons and gorges of Serbia
Archaeological sites in Serbia
Nišava District
Nature parks in Serbia